Kon Tum province lies in the Central Highlands region of Vietnam and shares borders with Laos and Cambodia. It has an area of 9,934 square km and a population of approximately 530,000. The economy is primarily agricultural.

Name
The name Kon Tum comes from the name of a village of the Bahnar ethnic group. In the Bahnar language, kon means "village" and tum means "pool".

Administrative divisions
Kon Tum is subdivided into ten district-level sub-divisions:

They are further subdivided into six commune-level towns (or townlets), 83 communes, and 10 wards.

Geography
Neighboring provinces are Quảng Nam to the north, Quảng Ngãi to the east and Gia Lai to the south. The capital city is Kon Tum, located on the Đăk Bla river.

The southern border with Gia Lai follows the Sê San river up to Yali Falls Dam, as well as part of the Dak Bla, Dak Pokei and Dak Poe rivers.

The province is primarily located in the Sê San river basin, though parts are also in the headwaters of the Vu Gia, Trà Khúc and Sekong Rivers.

Demographics
Ethnic groups in Kon Tum province include the Viet, Bahnar, Brau, Giẻ Triêng, Jarai, Rơ Măm, and Xo Dang.

Notable residents
Siu Black, popular singer

See also
 Battle of Đắk Tô

External links
Kon Tum province government official site

 
Provinces of Vietnam